Mirosław Wojciech Trzeciak (born 11 April 1968), nicknamed Franek, is a Polish retired footballer who played as a striker.

Football career
Trzeciak was born in Koszalin. During his career, Trzeciak, a Gwardia Koszalin trainee, also represented Lech Poznań – two different spells – BSC Young Boys (Switzerland), Maccabi Tel Aviv FC (Israel, for a few months), ŁKS Łódź, CA Osasuna and Polideportivo Ejido (both in Spain). In the latter country his La Liga totals consisted of ten matches during the 2000–01 season, spent with the former side.

The best years of Trzeciak's career were spent in Lech Poznań, where he won three leagues, one cup and one supercup. For eight years he was also a Poland international (22 caps, eight goals), but his best period arrived towards the end, during the Janusz Wójcik era (1997–99).

After his football career was over, Trzeciak stayed in Andalusia with former club Poli Ejido, coaching its junior teams. Subsequently he became a sports commentator in Poland and, in January 2007, he began working as director of sport development for Legia Warsaw.

International goals

External links

1968 births
Living people
People from Koszalin
Sportspeople from West Pomeranian Voivodeship
Polish footballers
Association football forwards
Ekstraklasa players
Lech Poznań players
ŁKS Łódź players
Swiss Super League players
BSC Young Boys players
Maccabi Tel Aviv F.C. players
La Liga players
Segunda División players
CA Osasuna players
Polideportivo Ejido footballers
Poland international footballers
Polish expatriate footballers
Expatriate footballers in Switzerland
Expatriate footballers in Israel
Expatriate footballers in Spain
Polish expatriate sportspeople in Switzerland
Polish expatriate sportspeople in Israel
Polish expatriate sportspeople in Spain